The Business and Professionals Federation of Hong Kong (abbreviated 工商專聯; BPF) is a non-partisan think tank in the Hong Kong Special Administrative Region of the People's Republic of China.

Mission
The mission BPF is:
 to help enhance the competitiveness, long-term prosperity and stability of Hong Kong;
 to promote the continuous development of Hong Kong as a free, capitalist and international financial and business centre;
 to conduct in-depth studies on issues of strategic importance to Hong Kong's economic, social and political development; and
 to promote the importance of strong economic cooperation between Hong Kong and the Mainland.

History
The BPF was founded in 1990 as a successor to the "Group of 89 members" of the Basic Law Consultative and Drafting Committees, a group of conservative business and professional leaders which opposed to faster pace of democraticsation. It maintained close relationship with other parties of business background, especially the Liberal Party. 

Led by the pro-Beijing tycoon Vincent Lo, the Federation was against the then Governor Chris Patten's proposal of constitutional reforms for the Legislative Council which Beijing strongly opposed.

References

External links 
 BPF official website

Non-profit organisations based in Hong Kong
Political and economic think tanks based in Hong Kong
Think tanks established in 1990
1990 establishments in Hong Kong
Politics of Hong Kong